Natallia Stanislavauna Kareiva (born 14 November 1985) is a Belarusian runner who specializes in the middle distance events.

Kareiva received a two-year ban from the sport for doping after her biological passport showed abnormalities. The ban was set for the periods from August 2014 to 2016 and all her performances from 28 July 2010 up to that period were erased.

Achievements

References

1985 births
Living people
Doping cases in athletics
Belarusian sportspeople in doping cases
Belarusian female middle-distance runners
Athletes (track and field) at the 2012 Summer Olympics
Olympic athletes of Belarus
People from Lida
Competitors at the 2007 Summer Universiade
Sportspeople from Grodno Region